Hisukattus is a genus of the spider family Salticidae (jumping spiders).

Species
As of May 2017, the World Spider Catalog lists the following species in the genus:
 Hisukattus alienus Galiano, 1987 – Brazil
 Hisukattus simplex (Mello-Leitão, 1944) – Argentina
 Hisukattus transversalis Galiano, 1987 – Argentina, Paraguay
 Hisukattus tristis (Mello-Leitão, 1944) – Argentina

References

Salticidae
Spiders of South America
Salticidae genera